Count Rodolfo Giovanni di Marazzino, also known as Ruldof Morzin, (c. 11 November 1585 – 1645) was from an Italian family who served in the Imperial Army of the Holy Roman Empire (which he joined in 1629) during the Thirty Years War rising to the rank of Field Marshal. In 1639 he was defeated and captured at the Battle of Chemnitz.

Assessment
William Guthrie states that Marazzino was "a brave and reliable subordinate, he was poorly suited to independent command and wholly out of his depth against the Swedish commander Johan Banér".

Notes

References

1585 births
1645 deaths
Military personnel of the Holy Roman Empire